Mansheyat Bani Hasan or Al-Manshia is a Jordanian multi-sports club based in Mafraq, and founded in 1978.

Current squad

Current technical staff

Managerial history 
 Adnan Al-Shuaibat
 Fares Shdifat
 Mahmoud Al-Khub
 Haitham Al-Shboul
 Khadr Badwan
 Bilal Al-Laham
 Osama Qasem

Kit providers 
Uhlsport
Adidas
Nike

References

External links 
Mansheyat Bani Hasan Zarqa (11/12)
فريق: منشية بني حسن
Jordan - Mansheyat Bani Hasan - Results, fixtures, squad, statistics, photos, videos and news - Soccerway

1978 establishments in Jordan
Football clubs in Jordan
Association football clubs established in 1978